John Mulholland (20 January 1932 – 26 July 2000) was a Scottish footballer, who played as a centre forward in the Football League for Chester and Halifax Town.

In 1958, he was involved in a car crash which ended his football career.

References

1932 births
2000 deaths
Sportspeople from Dumbarton
Footballers from West Dunbartonshire
Association football forwards
Scottish footballers
Southampton F.C. players
Chester City F.C. players
Halifax Town A.F.C. players
Lovell's Athletic F.C. players
English Football League players